Blow It Out may refer to:

 "Blow It Out" (Ludacris song)
 Blow It Out (Features song)
 Blow It Out (album), a 1977 album by Tom Scott